Dominion is the third studio album by the American heavy metal band Benedictum, released through Frontiers Records in 2011.

Track listing
"Dominion"	 4:18
"At the Gates"	 3:59
"Seer"	 4:34
"Grind It"	 2:44
"Prodigal Son"	 4:55
"The Shadowlands"	 4:56
"Beautiful Pain"	 1:29
"Dark Heart"	 4:00
"Bang"	 4:30
"Loud Silence"	 5:07
"Epsilon"	 8:54
"Sanctuary (Bonus Track)"	 5:07
"Overture/Temples of Syrinx (Bonus Track)"	 8:21

Personnel
Veronica Freeman – vocals
Pete Wells – guitar
Chris Shrum – bass
Tony Diaz – keyboards
Mikey Pannone – drums

2011 albums
Benedictum albums
Frontiers Records albums
Albums produced by Ryan Greene